The 1987–88 Austrian Hockey League season was the 58th season of the Austrian Hockey League, the top level of ice hockey in Austria. Seven teams participated in the league, and EC KAC won the championship.

First round

Final round

External links
Austrian Ice Hockey Association

1987–88
Aus
League